Bozdoğan is a small historic town and district of Aydın Province in the Aegean region of Turkey,  from the city of Aydın.

Bozdoğan is high on the side of Mount Madran, the source of the highly valued Pınar Madran mineral water, which is bottled and packaged at the source. The surroundings are also green and mildly forested. The local economy depends on organic agriculture, especially olives, figs, fruits and vegetables which are exported to the markets of Europe and America.

Bozdoğan itself is a small, quiet town of historic narrow cobble stone streets, and stone houses. Bozdoğan has a population 9,888.

History
From 1867 until 1922, Bozdoğan was part of the Aidin Vilayet of the Ottoman Empire.

References

External links 
  
  
 local information 

Populated places in Aydın Province
Districts of Aydın Province
Bozdoğan District